Sailing at the 2000 Summer Olympics in Sydney was held from 17–30 September 2000 at the Olympic Sailing Shore Base in the Sydney Harbour.

The quota for sailing at the 2000 Summer Olympics was 400, of which 124 positions were for men, 92 for women and 184 'open' to men or women. The Sailing Program of 2000 consisted of a total of eleven sailing classes (disciplines). For each class with the exception of the Soling and the 49er, eleven races were scheduled from 17–30 September 2000. For the Soling six fleet races were scheduled followed by a series of match races for the top twelve boats of the fleet race result. The 49er had sixteen scheduled fleet races. The sailing was done on six course areas and several types of course configurations.

The Sydney 2000 Games featured a name change for the sport, previously known as yachting.

Venue 

The choice of Sydney Harbour as the sailing venue allowed a huge number of spectators access to the action. However, there was not a great level of interest for this and only 2000 tickets had been sold one month before the start of the event.

The Olympic Sailing Shore Base was located on parts of Rushcutters Bay Park, Yarranabbe Park, the Sir David Martin Reserve and the waters of Rushcutters Bay. The shore base was used for logistic support and competition management and included temporary structures for the sailing events such as a marina for 250 boats. A new permanent public jetty for water taxis was also constructed.

Variable weather patterns necessitated a flexible competition schedule. Four course areas inside Sydney Harbour were used in combination with two offshore course areas. The Soling match racing was staged in Farm Cove at the forecourt of the Sydney Opera House.

Competition

Overview

Countries

Classes (equipment)

Medal summary

Women's Events

Men's Events

Open Events

Medal table

References

Bibliography 

 
 
 
 
 
 

 
2000 Summer Olympics events
2000
2000 in sailing
Sailing competitions in Australia